Alcot is an unincorporated community in Lee County, in the U.S. state of South Carolina.

History
Alcot was founded about 1900, and named after Louisa May Alcott, a favorite author of the postmaster's daughter. A post office called Aclot was established in 1894, and remained in operation until 1906. 

In 1925, Alcot had 65 inhabitants.

References

Unincorporated communities in South Carolina
Unincorporated communities in Lee County, South Carolina